Henry Spencer Law  (10 May 1802 – 15 July 1885) was the fifth son of Edward Law, 1st Baron Ellenborough, and Anne Towry. He graduated from Cambridge University with a Master of Arts (M.A.). He was a practising barrister at the Inner Temple, and was called to the bar in Michaelmas term, 1833. He served in the Life Guards and 28th Regiment.  Law was a barrister and Private Secretary to his brother Edward Law, 1st Earl of Ellenborough, when First Lord of the Admiralty in 1846 and President of the Board of Control in 1858. He was appointed as a justice of the Liberty of the Cinque Ports in 1850. He held the office of Deputy Lieutenant (D.L.) of Kent, to which he was appointed in 1853. He was also Clerk of the Docquets (or Dockets) until the abolition of that office, when he was awarded a pension.

Law married on 16 May 1839 Dorothea Anne Rochfort (d. 25 November 1871), 1st daughter of Colonel John Staunton Rochfort, of Clogregane, co. Carlow, by his wife Mary Burgh and had issue:

 Edward Downes Law, 5th Baron Ellenborough
 Cecil Henry Law, 6th Baron Ellenborough
 Louisa Isabella Law (died on 14 October 1899)
 Hon Ethel Beatrice Law (granted the style and precedence of a Baron's daughter by Royal Warrant 1902, Sister of the Community of Bethany, Lloyd's Square, London WC1, and died on 13 November 1937)
 Horatio "Horace" John Law born 12 October 1843, died 2 July 1855 in Lowndes Street, Middlesex, and was buried at Kensal Green.

Law died on 15 July 1885 and is buried in Brompton Cemetery.

References 

1802 births
1885 deaths
People educated at Eton College
Alumni of St John's College, Cambridge
Younger sons of barons
British Life Guards officers
28th Regiment of Foot officers
English barristers